Henry Pelham Alexander Pelham-Clinton, 6th Duke of Newcastle-under-Lyne (25 January 1834 – 22 February 1879) was an English nobleman, styled Lord Clinton until 1851 and Earl of Lincoln until he inherited the dukedom in 1864.

Pelham-Clinton was the son of Henry Pelham-Clinton, 5th Duke of Newcastle and his wife Lady Susan Hamilton. He was educated at Eton College and Christ Church, Oxford.

His political career was limited to sitting as Member of Parliament for Newark between 1857 and 1859. He did not hold any significant political offices in Nottinghamshire, although he was Provincial Grand Master of the Nottinghamshire Freemasons from 1865 to 1877.

Lincoln's taste for gambling resulted in his fleeing the country in 1860 to escape his debts, which had then reached £230,000 (in excess of £26 million in 2017 terms). In 1861, he married Henrietta Hope, heiress of the wealthy Henry Thomas Hope, in Paris. As part of the marriage settlement, his debts were paid and an income of £50,000 a year was settled on the couple. Extensive lands in England and Ireland were also added to his family's holdings by inheritance from his father-in-law, although Pelham-Clinton himself never controlled them due to the terms of that testament.

He succeeded his father as Duke of Newcastle in 1864 and had five children with Henrietta:
 Lady Beatrice Adeline Pelham-Clinton (1862–1935) who married Sir Cecil Lister-Kaye, 4th Baronet in 1880
 Lady Emily Augusta Mary Pelham-Clinton (1863–1919) who married Prince Alphonso Doria Pamphilj, Duc d'Avigliano in 1882
 Henry Pelham-Clinton, 7th Duke of Newcastle-under-Lyne (1864–1928)
 Francis Pelham-Clinton-Hope, 8th Duke of Newcastle-under-Lyne (1866–1941)
 Lady Florence Josephine Pelham-Clinton (1868–1935)

References

External links 
Biography of the 6th Duke, from Manuscripts and Special Collections at The University of Nottingham

1834 births
1879 deaths
19th-century English nobility
People educated at Eton College
Alumni of Christ Church, Oxford
006
Henry
Lincoln, Henry Pelham-Clinton, Earl of
Lincoln, Henry Pelham-Clinton, Earl of
UK MPs who inherited peerages
Henry